Spencer Kellogg Warnick (September 14, 1874 in Amsterdam, Montgomery County, New York – May 18, 1954 in Amsterdam, Montgomery Co., NY) was an American politician from New York.

Life
He was the son of Middleton Warnick (1845–1904) and Marion (Kellogg) Warnick (1849–1903). He graduated from Yale College in 1895. Then he studied law, was admitted to the bar in 1897, and commenced practice in Buffalo, but returned the next year to Amsterdam. On June 1, 1898, he married Jane Maria Greene, and they had two children.

Warnick was a member of the New York State Senate (27th D.) from 1903 to 1906, sitting in the 126th, 127th, 128th and 129th New York State Legislatures.

He died on May 18, 1954, in a hospital in Amsterdam, New York.

Sources
 Official New York from Cleveland to Hughes by Charles Elliott Fitch (Hurd Publishing Co., New York and Buffalo, 1911, Vol. IV; pg. 365)
 The New York Red Book by Edgar L. Murlin (1903; pg. 100)
 SPENCER K. WARNICK in NYT on May 19, 1954 (subscription required)
 Bio at RootsWeb

1874 births
1954 deaths
Republican Party New York (state) state senators
People from Amsterdam, New York
Yale College alumni